Urbain Cancelier (born 2 August 1959) is a French comedian and actor, primarily known for his collaborations with French film director Jean-Pierre Jeunet, and for playing Collignon in Le Fabuleux Destin d'Amélie Poulain.

Theater

Filmography

References

External links
 
 CinEmotions.com

Living people
1959 births
French male film actors
French male television actors
20th-century French male actors
21st-century French male actors
Male actors from Paris
French male stage actors